Tom Sheridan is a GAA handball player from Ireland who represents his county Meath.

Past achievements
1979 U12 60 x 30 Doubles (with M McGovern)
1980 U12 60 x 30 Doubles (with M McGovern)
1982
U14 40 x 20 Doubles (with A McGovern)
U14 60 x 30 Doubles (with A McGovern)
1983
U16 40 x 20 Doubles (with A McGovern)
U16 60 x 30 Doubles (with A McGovern)
1984
U16 40 x 20 Doubles (with D Gough)
U16 60 x 30 Doubles (with B Ferguson)
1985
Minor 40 x 20 Doubles (with W O’Connor)
Minor 60 x 30 Doubles (with W O’Connor)
Minor Hardball Singles
Minor Hardball Doubles (with W O’Connor)
1986
Minor 60 x 30 S
Minor 60 x 30 Doubles (with W O’Connor)
Minor Hardball Doubles (with W O’Connor)
1987
Senior 40 x 20 Doubles (with J McGovern)
Junior 60 x 30 Doubles (with J McGovern)
1988 Senior 40 x 20 Doubles (with J McGovern)
1989 Junior Hardball Doubles (with C McGovern)
1990 Senior 40 x 20 Doubles (with J McGovern)
1992
Senior 40 x 20 Doubles (with J McGovern)
Senior 60 x 30 Doubles (with J McGovern)
Senior Hardball Doubles (with W O’Connor)
1993 Senior 40 x 20 Doubles (with J McGovern)
1994
Senior Hardball Doubles (with W O’Connor)
Senior 60 x 30 Doubles (with J McGovern)
1996 Senior 40 x 20 Doubles (with E Jensen)
1997 Senior 40 x 20 Doubles (with E Jensen)
1998
Senior 60 x 30 Doubles (with W O’Connor)
Senior Hardball Doubles (with W O’Connor)
1999 Senior 60 x 30 Doubles (with W O’Connor)
2000 Senior 40 x 20 Doubles (with W O’Connor)
2001 Senior 60 x 30 Doubles (with W O’Connor)
2002
Senior 40 x 20 Doubles (with W O’Connor)
Senior 60 x 30 Doubles (with W O’Connor)
2003
Senior 60 x 30 Singles
Senior 60 x 30 Doubles (with W O’Connor)
2004 Senior 60 x 30 Doubles (with W O’Connor)

References

Year of birth missing (living people)
Living people
Gaelic handball players
Sportspeople from County Meath